The 1919–20 Trinity Blue and White's basketball team represented Trinity College (later renamed Duke University) during the 1919–20 men's college basketball season. The head coach was Walter Rothensies, coaching his first season with Trinity. The team finished with an overall record of 10–4.

Schedule

|-

References

Duke Blue Devils men's basketball seasons
Duke
1919 in sports in North Carolina
1920 in sports in North Carolina